Abu Dhabi Mall is a shopping mall in central Abu Dhabi, United Arab Emirates. It opened on 15 May 2001 and has over 200+ shops, food Court and cinema. The Mall is located next to the Beach Rotana hotel, with a direct internal entrance from the hotel. In January 2017, Forbes recognized Abu Dhabi Mall as one of the top shopping malls in Abu Dhabi.

See also
List of shopping malls in the United Arab Emirates

References

External links
Official website
Abu Dhabi and UAE shopping malls – brief descriptions of shopping malls and facilities.
Shopping Malls and Centers in Abu Dhabi – TEN Yellow Pages

2001 establishments in the United Arab Emirates
Shopping malls established in 2001
Shopping malls in Abu Dhabi